Mark Davies (born 12 May 1962) is a British Anglican bishop. Since 2008, he has been the Bishop of Middleton, a suffragan bishop in the Church of England Diocese of Manchester.

Early life and education
Davies was born on 12 May 1962. After graduating from the College of Ripon and York St John in 1985 with a Bachelor of Arts (BA Hons) honours degree awarded by Leeds University, he studied for the Anglican ministry at the College of the Resurrection in Mirfield starting in 1986, where he received a Certificate in Pastoral Theology.

Ordained ministry
Davies was made a deacon at Petertide 1989 (1 July) by Richard Hare, Bishop of Pontefract, and ordained a priest the Petertide following (1 July 1990) by David Hope, Bishop of Wakefield — both times at Wakefield Cathedral. His first pastoral appointment was as a curate at St Mary's Church in Barnsley from 1989 to 1992, after which he served as the Priest-in-Charge at St Paul's Church, Old Town, Barnsley until 1995. His next appointment was as Rector of Hemsworth until 2006; whilst at Hemsworth: he was a Vocations Advisor and Assistant Diocesan Director of Ordinands (ADDO) for the Diocese of Wakefield from 1998; Rural Dean of Pontefract (from 2000); a Proctor in Convocation (a member of the General Synod Convocation of York), from 2000; and an honorary canon of Wakefield Cathedral from 2002. In 2006, he moved from Yorkshire to Greater Manchester to serve as Archdeacon of Rochdale, relinquishing all his previous posts.

Episcopal ministry
He was nominated Bishop of Middleton on 10 March 2008 in succession to Michael Lewis who was translated to the Anglican Diocese of Cyprus and the Gulf. At the time of his appointment, he was the Church's youngest bishop.

Davies, along with Chris Edmondson, Bishop of Bolton (his fellow suffragan in Manchester), and Robert Paterson, Bishop of Sodor and Man, was consecrated on 25 April 2008 at York Minster by John Sentamu, Archbishop of York. He and Edmondson were installed at Manchester Cathedral on 27 April 2008.

Davies' residence as Bishop of Middleton is in Rochdale, Greater Manchester. Between the retirement of Nigel McCulloch on 17 January 2013 and David Walker's confirmation on 7 October 2013, Davies and Edmondson were (co-equally) acting Bishops of Manchester. Since Edmondson's retirement in 2016, Davies has been the senior suffragan of the diocese.

Personal life
Davies has been married once, and they have one son; it was announced on 30 May 2012 that Davies and his wife of 21 years were to divorce. His interests include literature, music, food, walking and gardening.

Styles
The Reverend Mark Davies (1989–2002)
The Reverend Canon Mark Davies (2002–2006)
The Venerable Mark Davies (2006–2008)
The Right Reverend Mark Davies (2008–present)

References

External links

1962 births
Living people
Alumni of the University of Leeds
Bishops of Middleton
Archdeacons of Rochdale
21st-century Church of England bishops